Mohamed Hasan Khalifa Mohamed Al-Shamsi (born 4 January 1997) is an Emirati footballer who plays as a goalkeeper for Al-Wahda.

Career
Al Shamsi made his professional debut in the UAE Pro-League for Al-Wahda on 16 September 2017, starting in the away match against Dibba Al-Fujairah, which finished as a 5–0 win.

Al Shamsi was included in United Arab Emirates's squad for the 2019 AFC Asian Cup in the United Arab Emirates.

Career statistics

International

References

External links
 
 
 
 
 Mohamed Al Shamsi at WorldFootball.com

1997 births
Living people
People from the Emirate of Sharjah
Emirati footballers
United Arab Emirates international footballers
Association football goalkeepers
Al Wahda FC players
UAE Pro League players
2019 AFC Asian Cup players
Footballers at the 2018 Asian Games
Asian Games bronze medalists for the United Arab Emirates
Asian Games medalists in football
Medalists at the 2018 Asian Games